James Forbes Chapin (July 23, 1919 – July 4, 2009) was an American jazz drummer and the author of books about jazz drumming. He was the author of several albums (later converted to CDs) on jazz drumming, as well as 2 CDs entitled Jim Chapin: Songs, Solos, Stories (Vols. 1 and 2). He was posthumously inducted into the Modern Drummer Hall of Fame in 2011.

Career
Chapin was born in Manhattan, New York, the son of Abigail Forbes and painter James Ormsbee Chapin. He did not begin playing the drums until he was 18 years old, after being inspired by legendary drummer Gene Krupa. He left Bard College in early 1938 after skipping classes regularly in order to obey a massive compulsion to batter a set of drums that a classmate had left set up in the gymnasium. He was a student of Sanford A. Moeller, a rudimentalist who popularized the Moeller method. Within two years Chapin was playing opposite Krupa at the 1939 World's Fair in New York.

From the 1940s through the 1960s, Chapin performed and toured with a variety of bands, including Glen Gray and the Casa Loma Orchestra and groups led by the likes of Mike Riley, Woody Herman, Tommy Dorsey and Tony Pastor. He also performed on occasion with his sons, Tom, Steve and Harry Chapin who was on a career high as one of the more notable singer-songwriters of the 1970s and a founding member of the World Hunger Year. And he led his own bands well into his 80s.

Chapin continued traveling around the world teaching and presenting seminars, including teaching Peter Criss, after he left the group Kiss in the early '80s. He was a fixture at music trade shows and percussion conventions. In 1994, Chapin received two honors for his contributions to music and education: the American Eagle Award, presented by the National Music Council in Washington and a lifetime achievement award from the Berklee College of Music in Boston. And in 1995, he was inducted into the Percussive Arts Society Hall of Fame.

He was the father of ten children, including musicians Harry, Tom (not to be confused with Thomas Chapin) and Steve Chapin, who are also the children of Elspeth Hart, the daughter of Kenneth Burke. He was the grandfather of Jen Chapin and two of the three members of the Chapin Sisters group. He was the direct descendant of Deacon Samuel Chapin. Jim Chapin died on July 4, 2009, in Florida a few weeks shy of 90 years old.

Method books

In the early 1940s, Chapin began working on a drum instruction book that was published in 1948 as Advanced Techniques for the Modern Drummer, Volume I, Coordinated Independence as Applied to Jazz and Be-Bop. This book has been known as "the definitive study on coordinated independence" for jazz drummers. After the release of the book, he carried a pair of drumsticks in his back pocket at all times in case he was called upon to demonstrate a difficult passage and prove that every pattern in the book could be played. The book became known among drummers as The Chapin Book

In 1971, Chapin published Advanced Techniques for the Modern Drummer, Volume II, Independence: The Open End. In the preface, he acknowledged that he could not play every pattern in the book. Some of his techniques were captured on an instructional video released in 1992 called Speed, Power, Control, Endurance. In this video, he spent the entire time using a practice pad to demonstrate the methods of his instructor, Sanford Moeller.

References

External links
Article on Jim Chapin at Drummerworld
Article on Jim Chapin in Drum! magazine

1919 births
2009 deaths
20th-century American drummers
American male drummers
American jazz drummers
American jazz musicians
Musicians from New York City
Jazz musicians from New York (state)
20th-century American male musicians
American male jazz musicians